Amit V Masurkar is an Indian film director and screenwriter.

He directed the independent comedy film Sulemani Keeda. His second feature film, Newton was selected as the Indian entry for the Best Foreign Language Film at the 90th Academy Awards. He also won the Asia Pacific Screen Award for Best Screenplay for this film.

Early life and education
Masurkar dropped out of an engineering course at Manipal Institute of Technology at the age of 20 to pursue filmmaking. He later acquired a BA degree in history from Mumbai University.

Filmography 
Films

References

External links
 

Living people
21st-century Indian film directors
Hindi-language film directors
Year of birth missing (living people)